The "Bound 4 Beijing Tour" was a tour for the US Softball Team in preparation for the 2008 Olympics.  The Team went to face many College, Professional, International, and ASA teams.

Schedule

Roster
The roster of the 2008 USA national softball team is listed below.

  
Head Coach: Mike Candrea (Tucson, Ariz.. – Head Coach at the University of Arizona)
Full Time Assistant Coaches: Chuck D'Arcy, Karen Johns, John Ritterman

References

2008 in softball
Softball in the United States
Softball competitions in the United States
Beijing Tour
2008 in American sports